List of historical markers in Brown County, Wisconsin

Historical markers

See also
National Register of Historic Places listings in Brown County, Wisconsin

References

External links
Wisconsin Historical Society - Wisconsin Historical Markers

Brown
Tourist attractions in Brown County, Wisconsin
Wisconsin-related lists